Samuel Charles Braybrooke (born 12 March 2004) is an English professional footballer who plays as a midfielder for  club Leicester City.

Early and personal life
From Wigston, his father is a coach in nearby Oadby for the Oadby Owls. It was at the Owls where Braybrooke was spotted by Leicester scout Bill Ward playing at the age of six. After this he joined the Leicester Academy. He attended Wigston Academy. Standing at a height of 5 ft 7in with medium long blonde hair in a centre parting, due to his appearance he has been nicknamed "Modric" by Leicester City teammate Caglar Soyuncu. He has also been called the "Leicester Iniesta" by teammates in the England youth set up.

Club career
Braybrooke was revealed to have signed a new professional contract with Leicester City in February 2022, running into 2024. Braybrooke was first named as part of the Leicester City match day squads as a substitute for Premier League matches in October 2022. At the time he was England under-19 captain and had been appearing regularly for Leicester City’s under-23 team, as well as appearing on the substitutes bench in the UEFA Europa League. Prior to that he had also captained England under-18s. Leicester manager Brendan Rodgers has described him as “an outstanding player”. Braybrooke has stated that training regularly with the first team and learning from players such as James Maddison, Youri Tielemans, and Wilfred Ndidi has allowed him to develop his skills.

Braybrooke made his professional debut on 8 November 2022 in the EFL Cup against Newport County. On 1 February 2023, he announced that he had suffered an anterior cruciate ligament injury and "will be out for a long period of time".

International career
Braybrooke has been captain of the England national under-18 football team. In September 2022 he played for the first time for the England U19 team, against Montenegro U19. In January 2023 Braybrooke briefly went viral in Mexico when Premier League documentation erroneously stated that he was eligible to play for the Mexico national football team, before the mistake was rectified.

Career statistics

References

2004 births
Living people
Footballers from Leicestershire
English footballers
Association football midfielders
Leicester City F.C. players
England youth international footballers